Hyndland RFC is a rugby union side based in Scotstoun, Glasgow, Scotland.The club was founded in 1933. They play their home games at Scotstoun Stadium.

History

Hyndland RFC has access to training facilities in Glasgow at Scotstoun Stadium, home to Glasgow Warriors. They also use Victoria Park in Scotstoun to train. The club use the Partick Bowling club as a clubhouse. They have a long-standing annual pre-season fixture against Waid Academy F.P. to play for a silver chalice.

Hyndland Sevens

The club host an Under-23 Sevens tournament. The entrants play for the Kurt Lief Cup.

Honours

 Hyndland Sevens
 Champions: 1961
 Waid Academy F.P. Sevens
 Champions: 1986
 Strathendrick Sevens
 Champions: 1987
 Moray Sevens
 Champions: 1984

References

External links

Rugby union in Glasgow
Scottish rugby union teams
Sports teams in Glasgow
Rugby clubs established in 1933
1933 establishments in Scotland